The 2021 Holy Cross Crusaders football team represented the College of the Holy Cross as a member of the Patriot League during the 2021 NCAA Division I FCS football season. Led by fourth-year head coach Bob Chesney, Holy Cross compiled an overall record of 10–3 with a mark of 6–0 in conference play, winning the Patriot League title. The Crusaders advanced to the NCAA Division I Football Championship playoffs, where they beat Sacred Heart in the first round before losing to Villanova in the second round. They played their home games at Fitton Field in Worcester, Massachusetts.

Schedule

References

Holy Cross
Holy Cross Crusaders football seasons
Patriot League football champion seasons
2021 NCAA Division I FCS playoff participants
Holy Cross Crusaders football